Farland Point railway station is a disused railway station that served Farland Point in County Donegal, Ireland.

The station opened on 12 December 1864 when the Londonderry and Lough Swilly Railway built its line from Londonderry Middle Quay railway station to Farland Point.

It closed on 1 August 1866.

Routes

References

Disused railway stations in County Donegal
Railway stations opened in 1864
Railway stations closed in 1866
1864 establishments in Ireland
1866 disestablishments in Ireland
Railway stations in the Republic of Ireland opened in the 19th century